Magnolia gustavii is a species of plant in the family Magnoliaceae. It is native to the Assam region, Myanmar and Thailand.

References

gustavii
Flora of Assam (region)
Flora of Myanmar
Flora of Thailand
Taxonomy articles created by Polbot